Jazz at Oberlin is a live album by the Dave Brubeck Quartet. It was recorded in the Finney Chapel at Oberlin College in March 1953, and released on Fantasy Records as F 3245. The Fantasy Records album back cover states that drummer Lloyd Davis had a 103-degree fever during the performance.

Critic Nat Hentoff wrote in Down Beat magazine that the album ranks with the College of the Pacific and Storyville sets "as the best of Brubeck on record", and jazz critic Gary Giddins has written that it would "make many short lists of the decade's outstanding albums".

The concert is credited with making jazz a legitimate field of musical study at Oberlin, and furthermore initiating it as a subject of serious intellectual attention; Wendell Logan, the chair of Oberlin's Jazz Studies Department, described it as "the watershed event that signaled the change of performance space for jazz from the nightclub to the concert hall".

In addition, it was one of the early works in the cool jazz stream of jazz; The Guardian'''s John Fordham wrote that it "indicated new directions for jazz that didn't slavishly mirror bebop, and even hinted at free-jazz piano techniques still years away from realisation"; he further observed that it "marked Brubeck's eager adoption by America's (predominantly white) youth - a welcome that soon extended around the world ... for a rhythmically intricate instrumental jazz".

Track listing
"These Foolish Things (Remind Me of You)" (Holt Marvell, Jack Strachey, Harry Link) 6:25
"Perdido" (Juan Tizol, Hans Lengsfelder, Ervin Drake) 8:03
"Stardust" (Hoagy Carmichael, Mitchell Parish) 6:32
"The Way You Look Tonight" (Jerome Kern, Dorothy Fields) 7:43
"How High the Moon" (Nancy Hamilton, Morgan Lewis) 9:04

(Times are as given on the CD; the album numbers differ slightly.'')

The 10" LP and reel-to-reel version of the album did not include "How high the moon" and reordered the remaining tracks in a different way. Also, it includes the full version of "The Way You Look Tonight" with Paul Demond's full solo.

Side A
"Perdido" (Juan Tizol, Hans Lengsfelder, Ervin Drake)
"Stardust" (Hoagy Carmichael, Mitchell Parish)

Side B
"These Foolish Things (Remind Me of You)" (Holt Marvell, Jack Strachey, Harry Link)
"The Way You Look Tonight" (Jerome Kern, Dorothy Fields)

Personnel
Dave Brubeck - piano
Paul Desmond - alto saxophone
Lloyd Davis - drums
Ron Crotty - bass

References

External links
Legendary Brubeck Album Jazz at Oberlin was Recorded Fifty Years Ago
50 Great Moments in Jazz: Dave Brubeck's 'Jazz at Oberlin'

Dave Brubeck live albums
1953 live albums
Fantasy Records live albums
Oberlin College
1953 in Ohio